Lovepreet Singh  (born 10 September 1998) is an Indian professional footballer who plays as a goalkeeper for I-League club Mumbai Kenkre, on loan from Indian Super League club Chennaiyin.

Career statistics

Club

References

1998 births
Living people
Indian footballers
Association football goalkeepers
I-League players
Kerala Blasters FC Reserves and Academy players
I-League 2nd Division players
Indian Super League players
India youth international footballers
Indian Arrows players
Sudeva Delhi FC players
Footballers from Jalandhar